Anna Depenbusch (born 17 October 1977) is a German singer and musician.

Career 
Prior to her solo career, she was a background singer for a group called ,

In 2002 and 2003, she contributed vocals to several albums by Max Melvin under the name "Anastasica".

In 2005, she released her first album that united elements of pop, jazz, and chanson.  The song "Heimat" (Home) from this album was nominated for the German music writing prize (Deutschen Musikautorenpreis).

Her second album, The Mathematics of Anna Depenbusch (2011) reached No. 25 in the charts.

Discography 
 Ins Gesicht (Rintintin, 2005)
 Die Mathematik Der Anna Depenbusch (105 Music, 2011)
 Die Mathematik Der Anna Depenbusch in schwarz-weiß (105 Music, 2011)
 Sommer Aus Papier (105 Music, 2012)
 Das Alphabet der Anna Depenbusch (Columbia, 2017)
 Das Alphabet der Anna Depenbusch in schwarz-weiß (Sony/Columbia, 2018)

Singles 
 "Tango" (2005, Rintintin)
 "Heimat" (2007, Rintintin)
 "Wir sind Hollywood" (2010, 105 music)
 "Benjamin" (2012, 105 music)
 "Herzlich Willkommen"

References

External links

 Official Site

1977 births
English-language singers from Germany
Musicians from Hamburg
German jazz singers
Living people
21st-century German women singers